Nickforce was an improvised formation of the British First Army in the Tunisian campaign of the Second World War. It was hastily formed from elements of the British 6th Armoured Division on 14 February 1943, for the defence of Thala, during the latter stages of the Battle of Kasserine Pass. It took its name from the commanding officer, Brigadier Cameron Nicholson. In desperate fighting, the force successfully blocked a Kampfgruppe of the 10th Panzer Division, under the direct control of Generalfeldmarschall Erwin Rommel, on 21 and 22 February.

Order of battle
On 14 February 1943
 17th/21st Lancers
 2nd Lothians and Border Horse
 10th Battalion, Rifle Brigade (The Prince Consort's Own)
 1 Troop, "F" Battery 12th (Honourable Artillery Company) Regiment Royal Horse Artillery
 1 Troop, 450th Battery 71st (West Riding) Field Regiment, Royal Artillery

Units subsequently attached:
 2nd/5th Battalion, Leicestershire Regiment
 90 Battery, 23rd Field Regiment, Royal Artillery
 229 Battery, 58th (Duke of Wellingtons) Anti-Tank Regiment, Royal Artillery
 All of "F" Battery 12th (HAC) Regiment, Royal Horse Artillery
 4.2" Mortar Company, Royal Artillery

References

Military units and formations established in 1943
Ad hoc units and formations of the British Army